Ursus deningeri (Deninger's bear) is an extinct species of bear, endemic to Eurasia during the Pleistocene for approximately 1.7 million years, from .

The range of this bear has been found to encompass both Europe and Asia, demonstrating the ability of the species to adapt to many Pleistocene environments.

U. deningeri is a descendant of U. savini and an ancestor of U. spelaeus.

Morphology

Ursus deningeri has a combination of primitive and derived characters that distinguishes it from all other Pleistocene bears. Its mandible is slender like that of living brown bears and Ursus etruscus. It also has derived characters of cave bears (Ursus spelaeus) and is considered to be the descendant of Ursus savini and very close to the common ancestor of brown bears.

Fossil distribution
Sites and specimen ages:
Nalaikha, Mongolia: ~1.8 Mya to 800,000 years ago
West Runton Freshwater Bed, Cromer Forest Bed Formation, Norfolk, England: ~800,000–100,000 years ago
Cueva del Agua, Granada, Spain: ~800,000–100,000 years ago
Venosa bed excavations 1974–1976, Basilicata, Italy: ~800,000–100,000 years ago
Emirkaya-2, Central Anatolia, Turkey: ~800,000–100,000 years ago
Sima de los Huesos, Atapuerca, Spain: >300,000 years ago
Darband Cave, Alborz, Caspian, Iran: ~300,000–200,000 years ago
Stránská skála (Ursus Cave), Brno, Moravia, Czech Republic: excavations 1943–1944 ~790,000–600,000 years ago

Genetics
In 2013, a German team reconstructed the mitochondrial genome of an Ursus deningeri more than 300,000 years old, proving that authentic ancient DNA can be preserved for hundreds of thousand years outside of permafrost.

References

 Biglari, F., V. Jahani (2011). "The Pleistocene Human Settlement in Gilan, Southwest Caspian Sea: Recent Research.". Eurasian Prehistory 8 (1–8 (1–2): 3–28.

Pleistocene bears
Pleistocene species extinctions
Prehistoric mammals of Europe
Pleistocene carnivorans
Fossil taxa described in 1904